This is a list of the films produced in the cinema of Georgia in the 2010s, ordered by year of release:

External links
 Library of National filmography
 Georgian film at the Internet Movie Database
 http://www.babaduli.de

2010s
Films
Georgia
2010s in Georgia (country) television

ka:ქართული ფილმების სია
ru:Список фильмов Грузии